Felip Ortíz Martínez (born 27 April 1977), known simply as Felip, is a Spanish former footballer who played as a goalkeeper, and current FC Barcelona B assistant manager.

Club career
Born in Lleida, Catalonia, FC Barcelona youth graduate Felip spent his professional career mainly as a backup in the second division, with the addition of four seasons in the third level. He represented in the former tier FC Barcelona B, CF Extremadura, Gimnàstic de Tarragona (two spells), UD Salamanca and Orihuela CF, appearing in 130 league matches during one full decade.

From 2010 to 2012, Felip played amateur football in his native region, retiring at the age of 35.

International career
Felip was summoned by Spain for the 2000 Summer Olympics squad at Sydney, although he didn't play any match.

Personal life
Felip was a close friend of another La Masia youth product, Carles Puyol.

Honours

International
Spain U23
Summer Olympic silver medal: 2000

References

External links

1977 births
Living people
Sportspeople from Lleida
Spanish footballers
Footballers from Catalonia
Association football goalkeepers
Segunda División players
Segunda División B players
Tercera División players
FC Barcelona C players
FC Barcelona Atlètic players
CF Extremadura footballers
Gimnàstic de Tarragona footballers
UD Salamanca players
Orihuela CF players
Spain youth international footballers
Spain under-21 international footballers
Olympic footballers of Spain
Footballers at the 2000 Summer Olympics
Olympic medalists in football
Olympic silver medalists for Spain
Medalists at the 2000 Summer Olympics
FC Ascó players